Amarat may refer to:

Al Amarat, Oman
Emarat, Iran (disambiguation)
Al Amarat, Khartoum, Sudan